A sidearm is a weapon, usually a handgun, but sometimes a knife, dagger, sword, bayonet, or other melee weapon, which is worn on the body in a holster (in the case of a pistol or revolver) or sheath (in the case of a knife, dagger, sword, or bayonet) to permit immediate access and use. A sidearm is typically required equipment for military officers and may be carried by law enforcement personnel. Usually, uniformed personnel of these services wear their weapons openly, while plainclothes personnel have their sidearms concealed under their clothes. A sidearm may be carried alone, or as a back-up to a primary weapon such as a rifle, shotgun, or submachine gun.

Uses 

In many contemporary armies, the issue of a sidearm in the form of a service pistol is a clear sign of authority and is the mark of a commissioned officer or senior NCO. In the protocol of courtesy, the surrender of a commander's sidearm is the final act in the general surrender of a unit. If no ill will is meant, and a strict interpretation of military courtesy is applied, a surrendering commander may be allowed to keep his sidearm in order to exercise his right of command over his men. Similarly, many commanders on a local level have been anecdotally cited as having used the threat of their sidearms to motivate troops, to varied effect.

An important purpose of the sidearm is to be used if the primary weapon is not available (damaged or lost), if it has run out of ammunition, or if it malfunctions. Many Special Forces soldiers armed with an assault rifle or carbine like the M16 or M4 may also have a semi-automatic pistol as a sidearm. PDWs are often issued as personal sidearms to combat personnel who operate in cramped spaces in which an assault rifle or carbine would be impractical, such as truck drivers, helicopter pilots, and tank crews.

Other eras 
Originally, the term referred to swords, daggers, and similar mêlée weapons that were considered the sidearms for their respective time periods; while the modern use of the term sidearm still includes swords, daggers, bayonets and the like, today it usually pertains to pistols and similar firearms.

See also
 Service pistol
 Wakizashi, the short sword used by Japanese samurai warriors as a sidearm

References

Handguns
Personal weapons